Donna Henes (born September 19, 1945) is a ceremonial artist, urban shaman, ritual expert and consultant, speaker, workshop leader and award-winning writer.

Henes is originally from Cleveland, Ohio.

Biography
Since 1972, Henes – known as Mama Donna – has designed and led multi-cultural, non-denominational celebrations, using ancient, traditional rituals and contemporary ceremonies.
             
2010 is the fifth anniversary of Henes' book, The Queen of My Self: Stepping Into Sovereignty in Midlife (Monarch Press 2005). She has also written three others, The Moon Watcher's Companion (Marlowe & Co. 2004); Celestially Auspicious Occasions: Seasons, Cycles and Celebrations (Perigree: Penguin/Putnam 1996); and Dressing Our Wounds In Warm Clothes (Astro Artz 1982); as well as a quarterly journal, Always In Season: Living in Sync with the Cycles.

She publishes a monthly Ezine, The Queen's Chronicles and also writes columns for The Huffington Post, Beliefnet and UPI's (United Press International) Religion and Spirituality Forum. Her writings for adults and children have been syndicated in publications throughout the United States and Canada, and globally on the Internet.

In 2007, Henes was chosen to bless and lead New York's Village Halloween Parade, which is held annually in New York City's Greenwich Village.

For 18 years, until the 9/11 attacks in 2001 when the events could no longer be held, The Port Authority of New York and The Lower Manhattan Cultural Council supported Henes' production of her Celestially Auspicious Occasions.

Henes also performs outdoor equinox and solstice celebrations throughout New York City, including an annual "Eggs on End" ceremony, and has led similar celebrations in more than 100 other cities throughout the United States, Canada and Europe.

In 1984, she received a Mayoral Citation from New York City Mayor Ed Koch for designing the New York City Olympic Ticker Tape Parade and a Mayoral Citation from New York City Mayor David Dinkins in the early 1990s for her work as Shaman in the Streets.

She has been a recipient of four fellowships from the New York Foundation for the Arts and the National Endowment for the Arts, as well as numerous project grants from municipalities, corporations and foundations.

She served as children's book award judge for the United Nations Jane Addams Peace Association from 1980-1988.

Henes maintains a ceremonial center, ritual practice and consultancy in Brooklyn, New York, Mama Donna's Tea Garden and Healing Haven, where she works with individuals and groups to create personalized rituals for all of life's transitions.

References

 Daily News (New York)|Daily News, April 16, 1996
 The Village Voice, February 3, 1998
 Mayoral Citation - December 4, 1989
 Mayoral Citation - August 23, 1984

1945 births
Living people
American women writers
Feminist musicians
21st-century American women